The Academy of Vocal Arts (AVA) is a private school in Philadelphia, Pennsylvania, dedicated to providing higher education to aspiring opera singers. It is the only tuition-free institution in the world devoted solely to operatic training and performance. The school was founded in 1934 by Helen Corning Warden. Notable alumni include Lando Bartolini, Harry Dworchak, and Ruth Ann Swenson. The institution maintains a Hall of Fame for Great American Opera Singers which The Opera Quarterly described as equivalent to the kammersänger title in Europe. Some of the artists in the AVA's Hall of Fame include John Alexander, Rose Bampton, Lili Chookasian, Phyllis Curtin, Frank Guarrera, John Macurdy, Rosa Ponselle, Eleanor Steber, Jess Thomas, Jon Vickers, and Beverly Wolff.

References

External links

 
Music schools in Pennsylvania
Opera organizations
Educational institutions established in 1934
1934 establishments in Pennsylvania
Schools in Philadelphia
Arts organizations established in 1934